The 1998 Wisconsin Badgers football team represented the University of Wisconsin during the 1998 NCAA Division I-A football season.

Wisconsin finished the regular season 10–1 overall (7–1 conference) and were co-champions of the Big Ten Conference (with Ohio State and Michigan) for the first time since 1993.  They were awarded the berth in the 1999 Rose Bowl due to Big Ten Conference tie-breaking rules, at the time, which gave the Rose Bowl invitation to the tied team which had gone the longest period of time without an invitation: Michigan had been in the 1998 Rose Bowl, Ohio State had been in the 1997 Rose Bowl, while Wisconsin's last Rose Bowl was 1994.

The circumstances of this selection, the fact that Ohio State was the higher-ranked team (Ohio State was the pre-season #1 and spent most of the season with this ranking: Wisconsin did not play Ohio State or Michigan State that year, so Ohio State had the better record versus common opponents due to the Michigan loss), combined with the fact that the opponent (UCLA) was ranked #2 and headed to the national title game before a season-ending loss, led to ridicule in the national media: most notably, Craig James' declaration that Wisconsin was "the worst team to ever play in the Rose Bowl." Wisconsin went on to defeat #6 UCLA 38–31 in the 1999 Rose Bowl. Afterward, Badger coach Barry Alvarez fired back, "Well, I know we're at least the second worst."

Schedule

Rankings

Roster

Regular starters

Game summaries

UCLA (Rose Bowl)

Individual awards and honors
Tom Burke: All-America (unanimous consensus), Bill Willis Trophy, Big Ten Defensive Player of the Year, All-Big Ten (First Team, coaches & media)
Aaron Gibson: All-America (consensus), All-Big Ten (First Team, media; Second Team, coaches)
Ron Dayne: All-America (WCFF), 1999 Rose Bowl player of the Game, All-Big Ten (First Team, coaches & media)
Matt Davenport: All-Big Ten (First Team, coaches & media)
Kevin Stemke: All-Big Ten (First Team, coaches & media)
Jamar Fletcher: All-Big Ten (First Team, media; Second Team, coaches)
Casey Rabach: All-Big Ten (Second Team, coaches & media)
Chris McIntosh:All-Big Ten (Second Team, coaches)
Barry Alvarez: Big Ten Coach of the Year

1999 NFL Draft

References

Wisconsin
Wisconsin Badgers football seasons
Big Ten Conference football champion seasons
Rose Bowl champion seasons
Wisconsin Badgers football